David Cattanach (27 June 1946 – 4 February 2022) was a Scottish footballer who played for Stirling Albion, Celtic and Falkirk in the Scottish Football League. He died on 4 February 2022, at the age of 75.

References

External links

1946 births
2022 deaths
Scottish footballers
Footballers from Falkirk
Association football wing halves
Scottish Football League players
Celtic F.C. players
Falkirk F.C. players
Stirling Albion F.C. players